The FIS Nordic Junior and U23 World Ski Championships 2015 took place in Almaty, Kazakhstan from 3 February to 8 February 2015. It was the 38th Junior World Championships and the 10th Under-23 World Championships in nordic skiing.

Medal summary

Junior events

Cross-country skiing

Nordic Combined

Ski jumping

Under-23 events

Cross-country skiing

Medal table

References 

2015
2015 in cross-country skiing
2015 in ski jumping
Junior World Ski Championships
2015 in youth sport
International sports competitions hosted by Kazakhstan